Minister of Finance is the person in charge of the Ministry of Finance of Tonga.

Ministers
William Garfield Bagnall, January 1919 - July 1939
Horace E. Nicolson, 1939 - 1949
George Goodacre, 1950 - 1961
Mahe 'Uli'uli Tupouniua, 1961 - 1982
 Sione Tapa (acting September 1970 to May 1971, November 1972 to January 1981) 
James Cecil Cocker, 1982 - 1991
Tutoatasi Fakafanua, 1991 - 2000 (Tutoatasi Kinikinilau Fakafanua)
Siosiua 'Utoikamanu, 2001 - 2008 (Siosiua Tuitalukua Tupou 'Utoikamanu)
'Otenifi Afu'alo Matoto, 2008 - 2010
Sunia Manu Fili, 2010 - April 2012
Lisiate 'Akolo, April 2012 - December 2013
'Aisake Eke, January 2014 - March 2017
Tevita Lavemaau, March 2017 - January 2018
Pohiva Tu'i'onetoa, January 2018 - October 2019
Tevita Lavemaau, October 2019 - 28 December 2021
Tatafu Moeaki, 28 December 2021 -

See also
 Government of Tonga
 Economy of Tonga
 National Reserve Bank of Tonga

External links
 Website of the Ministry of Finance

References

Finance
Finance Ministers
Politicians

1919 establishments in Tonga